Ivan Todorov (born 7 October 1967) is a Yugoslav judoka and Serbian diplomat. He competed in the men's middleweight event at the 1988 Summer Olympics.

He has been working for the Serbian Ministry of Foreign Affairs since 2018, and as of 1 December 2018 he is the Ambassador of Serbia to Hungary.

References

1967 births
Living people
Yugoslav male judoka
Olympic judoka of Yugoslavia
Judoka at the 1988 Summer Olympics
Place of birth missing (living people)
Ambassadors of Serbia to Hungary